Guanyinge Township is a township of Guanyang County in northeastern Guangxi, China, located about  southeast of the county seat. , it has 16 villages under its administration.

See also 
 List of township-level divisions of Guangxi

References 

Townships of Guilin